Karlsborg (Kalix Language: kjalsbåri) locality situated in Kalix Municipality, Norrbotten County, Sweden with 351 inhabitants in 2010. Their bandy club Karlsborgs BK has played in the highest division.

References

External links

Populated places in Kalix Municipality
Norrbotten
Kalix